Katipunan ng Demokratikong Pilipino (KDP) is a Philippine neo-nationalist political party founded in 2018. It was formed by supporters of 16th President Rodrigo Duterte, including some officers affiliated with the Citizen National Guard, a nationalist, anti-communist political advocacy group, including party chairman and former Department of Education undersecretary , President Ramon Pedrosa, Executive Vice President Princess Lady Ann Indanan-Sahidulla, and Dr. Ricardo Fulgencio IV. The party had fielded former Lieutenant General Antonio Parlade Jr. in the 2022 presidential election, which he was disallowed to run by COMELEC.

The KDP is unrelated to the similarly named Katipunan ng mga Demokratikong Pilipino (Union of Democratic Filipinos), a United States-based Marxist–Leninist–Maoist group which had opposed the Ferdinand Marcos regime during the 1970s and 1980s. The said group had by the 1980s merged into the Oakland-based Marxist–Leninist–Maoist organization Line of March, later evolving into the Christian Social-Democratic Movement (CSDM).

Political positions 
KDP has been described as "ultra-right". KDP's electoral agenda for the 2019 elections were to "stop electoral fraud" by cancelling Smartmatic's contract with the Commission on Elections and reforming the electoral system, to prosecute those involved in the Dengvaxia controversy, and to reduce electrical bills by repealing the Electric Power Industry Reform Act (EPIRA) of 2001. Economic nationalism figures significantly in the party platform and covers shifting from a service economy to an agro-industrialized producer economy, food self-sufficiency and the integration of the Philippines into the Belt and Road Initiative. In addition, the party advocates a nonaligned, realist approach to foreign-policymaking, as well as federalism.

False claims on the Marcoses' stolen wealth 
KDP's Facebook page posted false information regarding the Marcos family's stolen wealth. The group posted a video that made multiple false claims about Ferdinand and Imelda Marcos's Swiss bank accounts. The video also made misleading claims about the source of the Marcos's wealth. A fact check of the video's false claims said that, in fact, the Supreme Court ruled in 2003 that the assets in question were ill-gotten wealth or stolen money. The video received 28,000 interactions on KDP's Facebook page. Excerpts of KDP's incorrect video were shared by a Tiktok user in 2021 and generated 95,000 interactions and almost 876,000 views.

Researchers noted that after Bongbong Marcos announced his candidacy for the presidency, claims praising his father, President Ferdinand Marcos Sr., and his authoritarian regime increased significantly.

Candidates for the 2019 general election 
Senatorial slate
Toti Casiño
Glenn Chong
Larry Gadon (guest candidate from Kilusang Bagong Lipunan and Lakas–CMD)

Nur-Ana Sahidulla

Local officials
Ariel Magcalas - former mayor of Santa Cruz, Laguna (2007–2010)
 Laarni Malibiran - vice mayor of Santa Cruz, Laguna (2019–present)

Electoral performance

Presidential and vice presidential elections

Legislative elections

References

External links 
Katipunan ng Demokratikong Pilipino on Facebook
Katipunan ng Demokratikong Pilipino on YouTube

2018 establishments in the Philippines
Nationalist parties in Asia
Political parties in the Philippines
Political parties established in 2018
Filipino nationalism
Anti-communist parties
Federalism in the Philippines
Federalist parties